The Stichting De Fryske Mole is a foundation for the preservation of windmills in the Dutch province Friesland, owning 42 of the 124 windmills in Friesland and closely co-operating with the Gild Fryske Mounders with which it publishes a quarterly magazine, De Utskoat. The Stichting De Fryske Mole was founded in December 1970 to preserve those mills that were otherwise difficult to save. Consequently, all of the foundation's mills are drainage mills often standing in remote locations where there are no other parties interested in or able to pay for restoration and maintenance.

See also 
 Gild Fryske Mounders
 De Hollandsche Molen

External links 
Website De Fryske Mole
De Utskoat

References 

Windmills in the Netherlands